The Nggamadi were an indigenous Australian people of the Cape York Peninsula of northern Queensland.

Name
They are often conflated with the Ankamuti, but Tindale regarded them as a separate tribal reality. Terry Crowley writes:-
In the region referred to locally as the "Seven Rivers" area (the seven rivers being the Jardine, MacDonald, Skardon, Doughboy, Ducie and Jackson Rivers, and Crystal Creek), which constitutes the very narrow coastal stretch from the northern side of Port Musgrave as far as the Doughboy River, and also the inland area of Crystal Creek and the middle Jardine River, were the aŋkamuṯi -speaking people. The non-coastal aŋkamuṯi of the Jardine River were alternatively called  yampaɣuƫaŋu or utuðanamu (meaning "leaf people" and "scrub dwellers" respectively). The aŋkamuṯi have previously been referred to in the literature by the name ŋkamuṯi (Gamiti in Roth 1910:96), Ngkamadyi in McConnel (1939-1940:60) and   Nggammadi in Sharp (1939:257), which was used for the aŋkamuṯi by the CV-dropping groups to the south of Port Musgrave (Crowley 1981:146).

Country
They lay north of the Dulhunty River as far as around Vrilya Point (Cockatoo Creek), and were present also at the Jackson and Skardon river s.

Alternative names
 Ngkamadyi
 Ngammatti
 Nggamiti
 Ngamiti
 Ngammatta
 Gamete
 Gamiti
 Gametty
 Gomokudin

Notes

Citations

Sources

Aboriginal peoples of Queensland